The Easter cycle is the sequence of the seasons and days in the Christian liturgical year which are pegged to the date of Easter, either before or after it. In any given calendar year, the timing of events within the Easter cycle is dependent on the calculation of the date of Easter itself.

Western Christianity 

The following liturgical seasons and days, celebrated by various traditions within Western Christianity, are celebrated a fixed amount of time either before or after the day of Easter.

 Pre-Lent
 Septuagesima
 Sexagesima
 Quinquagesima
 Lent
 Ash Wednesday
 Ember Days of Lent
 Laetare Sunday
 Passiontide
 Passion Sunday
 Holy Week
 Palm Sunday
 Holy Monday
 Holy Tuesday
 Holy Wednesday
 Triduum
 Holy Thursday (Chrism Mass / Mass of the Lord's Supper)
 Good Friday
 Holy Saturday
 Easter Vigil
 Easter
 Eastertide
 Octave of Easter
 Easter Monday
 Easter Tuesday
 Easter Wednesday
 Easter Thursday
 Easter Friday
 Easter Saturday
 Second Sunday of Easter (Divine Mercy Sunday)
 Third Sunday of Easter
 Fourth Sunday of Easter
 Fifth Sunday of Easter
 Sixth Sunday of Easter
 Minor Rogation Days
 Ascensiontide
 Feast of the Ascension
 Seventh Sunday of Easter
 Pentecost (Whitsun)
 Pentecost Season
 Octave of Pentecost
 Whit Monday
 Whit Tuesday
 Ember Days of Pentecost
 Trinity Sunday
 Feast of Corpus Christi
 Feast of Christ the Priest
 Feast of the Sacred Heart
 Feast of the Immaculate Heart

References 

Easter liturgy